Dangerous Nan McGrew is a 1930 Pre-Code American comedy film starring Helen Kane, Victor Moore and James Hall.

Plot

Dangerous Nan McGrew (Helen Kane) is the lead entertainer in a traveling medicine show. Muldoon (Victor Moore), a member of the medicine show, is a fugitive wanted for murder.  The medicine show gets stranded at the snowbound hunting lodge of a wealthy woman. Performing at a Christmas Eve show for the lodge guests, the saxophone-playing nephew of the landlady falls in love with Nan. The Royal Canadian Mounted Police are on the trail of Muldoon, and McGrew, a Sharpshooting singer, assists in the end.

Cast
Helen Kane as Dangerous Nan McGrew
Victor Moore as Muldoon
James Hall as Bob Dawes
Stuart Erwin as Eustace Macy
Frank Morgan as Doc Foster
 Roberta Robinson as Clara Benson 
Louise Closser Hale as Mrs. Benson 
Allan Forrest as Godfrey Crofton
John Hamilton as Grant

See also
The Bum Bandit (1931) Fleischer Studios cartoon starring Betty Boop as Nan McGrew

References

External links
  
 
 

1930 films
1930 comedy films
1930s English-language films
Paramount Pictures films
Films directed by Malcolm St. Clair
American comedy films
American black-and-white films
Films with screenplays by Garrett Fort
Royal Canadian Mounted Police in fiction
1930s American films